Bob "Crazy" Correll (born January 7, 1942) is a former daredevil and stuntman from Long Beach, California. According to his official biography from Balls, Unlimited, Inc., Correll has enjoyed a varied career racing motorcycles, drag cars, stock cars, and go-carts. He has also flown hang gliders, sail planes, powered planes, and hot-air balloons. From the 1970s to the late 1990s Bob Correll was associated with the following ventures:

The Kitecycle - Designed in the early 1970s and patented 1975, by Doug Malewicki of Aerovisions, Inc., the Kitecycle is a motorcycle/hangglider combination that has been featured on the television programs "That's Incredible," "The New and Spectacular Guinness Book of World Records," "CHiPs," and "I Dare You: The Ultimate Challenge," amongst others. This is recognized as a world record for wing-assisted jumps.
The Original Jet-Powered Dragster Motorcycle (The "Jetbike") - Correll's jet-powered motorcycle was not chain-driven, but operated using pure thrust. Craig Arfons converted the General Electric T-58 military helicopter engine for the project.
Robosaurus - Built by Monster Robots, Inc. of Sun Valley, CA. Bob Correll was the backseat operator ("co-pilot") from 1990 to 1993.
The F/18 Jetbike, a dragster motorcycle that featured an T-58 engine from a chinook helicopter. The bike received national exposure on the FX television program "The X Show" but was never licensed for exhibition racing.  According to Malewicki's personal website, Tim Arfons did the engine conversion and Chip Bassett did the machining and fabrication.
Since 2000, Correll has retired from the spotlight. He currently lives in Southern California.

References

External links
"Cycle Jumpers" - features early photos of Bob Correll and the Kitecycle.

American stunt performers
1948 births
Living people
American motorcycle racers